Mr. Doctor is a 1916 Hungarian film directed by Michael Curtiz.

Plot summary

Cast
 Márton Rátkai as Puzsér
 György Kürthy as Sárkány ügyvéd
 Lucie Labass as Sárkányné (as Lábass Juci)
 Annuska Fényes as Sárkány huga
 Gyula Szőreghy

References

External links
 
 

1916 films
Films directed by Michael Curtiz
Hungarian silent films
Hungarian black-and-white films
Austro-Hungarian films